Chiayi City Bus is a bus service managed by the Transportation Department, Chiayi City Government and operated by Kuo-Kuang Motor Transportation in Chiayi City, Taiwan, which runs five routes.

Fares
12 NTD per single section (iCash, iPass Card and Easy Card accessible)

Operators

History
Chiayi City Bus was established in 1949 with Chiayi City Bus Service Administration as its operator. Later on, Chiayi City was downgraded from a provincial city of Taiwan Province to a county-controlled city of Chiayi County. As a consequence, Chiayi City Bus Service Administration was dismissed and Chiayi City Bus was canceled from 1950 to February 1953. From the time February 1953, Chiayi County Government restarted to operate Chiayi City Bus and founded Chiayi County Bus Service Administration in September 1953 as its operator. From the time October, 2014 to May 2015, Chiayi Bus Company, Ltd get the right of management of Chiayi City Bus, which was later taken back by Chiayi County Bus Service Administration.

Routes 
Zhong-Shan Main Line
Zhong-Shan Main Line A
ZhongXiao-XinMin Main Line
ZhongXiao-XinMin Main Line A
Guanglinwojia Route

See also
 Chiayi City Government
 Chiayi Bus Rapid Transit

References

External links
Transportation and Tourism Department, Chiayi City Government http://www.chiayi.gov.tw/web/traffic/eindex.asp
Transportation and Tourism Department, Chiayi City Government(Chinese) https://web.archive.org/web/20170504053854/http://www.chiayi.gov.tw/web/traffic/taiwanbus.asp
Chiayi County Bus Service Administration http://www.cybus.gov.tw/home.aspx

1949 establishments in Taiwan
Bus transportation in Taiwan
Transportation in Chiayi